Christopher Lee Watton (born October 6, 1977) is a former American football offensive lineman for the Colorado Crush of the Arena Football League.

High school years
Watton attended Foley High School in Foley, Alabama and was a student and played football, basketball, track, and baseball. As a senior football player, Watton was an All-County selection, an All-Region selection, and an All-State selection.

External links
Just Sports Stats
Colorado Crush's bio page
AFL stats

1977 births
Living people
Sportspeople from Sioux Falls, South Dakota
People from Foley, Alabama
American football offensive tackles
Baylor Bears football players
Scottish Claymores players
Colorado Crush players